In the context of the UN Framework Convention on Climate Change (UNFCCC) process, loss and damage is the harm caused by anthropogenic (human-generated) climate change. 

The appropriate response to loss and damage has been disputed since the UNFCCC's adoption. Establishing liability and compensation for loss and damage has been a long-standing goal for vulnerable and developing countries in the Alliance of Small Island States (AOSIS) and the Least Developed Countries Group in negotiations. However, developed countries have resisted this. The present UNFCCC loss and damage mechanism, the Warsaw International Mechanism for Loss and Damage, focuses on research and dialogue rather than liability or compensation.

Definition 
The UNFCCC has defined loss and damage to include harms resulting from sudden-onset events (climate disasters, such as cyclones) as well as slow-onset processes (such as sea level rise). Loss and damage can occur in human systems (such as livelihoods) as well as natural systems (such as biodiversity), though the emphasis in research and policy is on human impacts. Within the realm of loss and damage to human systems, a distinction is made between economic losses and non-economic losses. The main difference between the two is that non-economic losses involve things that are not commonly traded in markets.

Climate reparations are loss and damage payments which are based on the concept of reparations. Climate reparations are a form of climate justice, in which compensation is necessary to hold countries accountable for loss and damage resulting from historical emissions, and is an ethical and moral obligation.

A Bangladeshi consultant remarked at COP26, "The term 'loss and damage' is a euphemism for terms we're not allowed to use, which are 'liability and compensation' ... 'Reparations' is even worse."

Early negotiations 
As the UNFCCC was being drafted in 1991, the AOSIS proposed the creation of an international insurance pool to "compensate the most vulnerable small island and low-lying coastal developing countries for loss and damage arising from sea level rise". In the proposal, the amount to be contributed by each country to this pool would be determined by their relative contribution to global emissions and their relative share of global gross national product, a formula "modelled on the 1963 Brussels Supplementary Convention on Third Party Liability in the field of Nuclear Energy".  This proposal was rejected, and when the UNFCCC was adopted in 1992 it contained no mention of loss or damage.

Loss and damage was first referred to in a formally-negotiated UN text in the 2007 Bali Action Plan, which called for "Disaster reduction strategies and means to address loss and damage associated with climate change impacts in developing countries that are particularly vulnerable to the adverse effects of climate change".

Warsaw International Mechanism for Loss and Damage 
The Warsaw International Mechanism for Loss and Damage, created in 2013, acknowledges that "loss and damage associated with the adverse effects of climate change includes, and in some cases involves more than, that which can be reduced by adaptation". Its mandate includes "enhancing knowledge and understanding", "strengthening dialogue, coordination, coherence and synergies among relevant stakeholders", and "enhancing action and support, including finance, technology and capacity-building, to address loss and damage associated with the adverse effects of climate change". However, it makes no provisions for liability or compensation for loss and damage.

The Paris Agreement provides for the continuation of the Warsaw International Mechanism but explicitly states that its inclusion "does not involve or provide a basis for any liability or compensation". The inclusion of this clause was the condition on which developed countries, particularly the United States, agreed to include a reference to loss and damage.

In reports of the Intergovernmental Panel on Climate Change 
The 5th Assessment Report of the Intergovernmental Panel on Climate Change (IPCC), published in 2013-2014 had no separate chapter on loss and damage, but Working Group II: Impacts, Adaptation and Vulnerability (WG2) Chapter 16 about adaptation limits and constraints, is very relevant for people interested in loss and damage. A qualitative data analysis of what the IPCC 5th Assessment Report has to say about loss and damage surprisingly showed that the term was used much more often in statements about Annex 1 countries (e.g. US, Australia or European countries) than in text about non-Annex 1 countries (most countries in Africa, Asia Latin America and the Pacific), which tend to be more vulnerable to impacts of climate change. Despite repeated suggestions by delegates from vulnerable countries, the IPCC 6th Assessment Report will not have a chapter on loss and damage.

COP 27: Loss and Damage accepted, Santiago Network to establish framework 
After three decades of pushing for compensation for 'Loss and Damage' caused by climate change, the 27th Conference of Parties adopted the proposal. The parties agree to utilise the Santiago Network, established at COP25, to provide technical assistance in averting, minimizing, and addressing loss and damage.

References 

Effects of climate change
Economics and climate change